Three icebreakers have been named Georgiy Sedov:

 , a steam-powered icebreaking vessel launched in 1908, acquired by the Soviet Union in 1915 and scrapped in 1967
 , a Project 97 icebreaker derivative built for the Soviet Navy in 1967 and decommissioned in 1992
 , an icebreaking supply vessel built in 1998 as Antarcticaborg and acquired by Russia in 2019

Ship names